Valery Khitrov (born 16 April 1941) is a former Soviet cyclist. He competed in the sprint at the 1964 Summer Olympics.

References

External links
 

1941 births
Living people
Soviet male cyclists
Olympic cyclists of the Soviet Union
Cyclists at the 1964 Summer Olympics
Place of birth missing (living people)